The Hundred of Hindmarsh is a cadastral unit of hundred in covering much of the locality of Tantanoola, South Australia, including the township. It is one of the 21 hundreds of the County of Grey located within the former Tantanoola Drainage District. Parts of the localities of Burrungule, Glencoe, Koorine and Mount McIntyre are also within the hundred. It was named in 1858 by Governor Richard Graves MacDonnell after former governor John Hindmarsh.

Local government
The District Council of Tantanoola was established out of the Tantanoola Drainage District in 1888, bringing local government to the hundred for the first time. Tantanoola council was amalgamated into the District Council of Millicent circa 1950s and ultimately became part of Wattle Range Council when Millicent was amalgamated with its neighbouring local councils in 1997.

See also 
 Lands administrative divisions of South Australia

References 

Hindmarsh
1858 establishments in Australia